Scalping is the practice of removing the scalp of a defeated enemy as a trophy. 

Scalping may also refer to:
 Scalping (trading), in trading securities and commodities either a fraudulent form of market manipulation or a legitimate form of arbitrage
 Flavor scalping, the loss of flavor in a packaged item generally due to its packaging
 Tarmac scalpings, gravel scraped off a road when the road is scarified before a new surface is laid
 Ticket resale, the resale of tickets to a public event such as a concert or sporting event

See also
 Scalp (disambiguation)
 Scalphunter (disambiguation)